Smith Reynolds Airport  is a public airport 3 miles (5 km) northeast of Winston-Salem in Forsyth County, North Carolina. The airport has two runways, and is used for general aviation and flight training as there is now no scheduled passenger airline (which is handled locally by the Piedmont Triad International Airport in Greensboro). It is home to the Winston-Salem air show, usually held in September, which draws about 20,000 spectators.

History 
The question of an airmail route and an airport for Winston-Salem was decided in the 1920s when land west of Greensboro was selected over a Winston-Salem tract, and Winston-Salem withdrew from the Tri-city Airport Commission.

A portion of land off Walkertown Avenue (present-day Liberty Street) was chosen as the perfect site for an airport. Clint Miller pledged $17,000 for the development of facilities at the airfield, so when the new Airport Corporation met for the first time, they decided the airfield would be named Miller Municipal Airport. Reynolds Aviation would be the main activity at Miller Field for its first five years. There were flights to New York, Detroit, Philadelphia and Baltimore, and weekend taxi service to Wrightsville and Myrtle Beach. In 1932, when Dick Reynolds disbanded Reynolds Aviation, a group of local businessmen formed Camel City Flying Service. Camel City renovated the existing structures, strengthened field lights and installed a grandstand for aerial shows.

Through the 1930s Miller Airport received many New Deal projects including a new administration building, a third runway, and a field lighting system.

In 1940 Charles Norfleet, the president of the Airport Commission, contacted Eastern Air Lines, requesting them to begin servicing Miller Airport. When Eastern agreed to add Miller Airport to its north-south route network, Dick Reynolds and his sisters, trustees of the Z. Smith Reynolds Foundation, donated funds from the Foundation to further modernize and expand the airport. In 1942, Miller Municipal Airport was renamed and dedicated to Smith Reynolds, a pioneer in aviation before his untimely death at the age of 20.

From 1942 until 1945, Smith Reynolds Airport was a training base for military pilots in addition to its commercial and private airline services.

Piedmont Airlines

Piedmont Airlines (1948-1989) was based at the airport.  Predecessor Camel City Flying Services had become Piedmont Aviation, Inc. in 1940 and spent the 1940s building a base in flight training and airline sales. The company grew to over 80 employees by 1947 when the federal Civil Aeronautics Board (CAB) awarded Piedmont Airlines a temporary certificate for regional air service. The company split into two divisions to continue to operate the fixed base operations (FBO) services and also operate four scheduled passenger feeder line routes extending from Wilmington, NC to Cincinnati, Ohio, serving twenty-two airports with one of three of the original DC-3s affectionately known as the Pacemakers.  According to the airline's July 1, 1948 system timetable, Piedmont was operating nonstop service from the airport to both Bristol, TN and nearby Greensboro-High Point, NC as well as direct, no change of plane service to Cincinnati, Lexington, Raleigh-Durham, Goldsboro, NC, New Bern, NC, Morehead City-Beaufort, NC and Wilmington, NC with all flights on Douglas DC-3s.  The route between Winston-Salem and Greensboro-High Point was the shortest commercial flight in the U.S. at 16 miles.

By 1953 Piedmont Airlines employed over 680 people and grossed over $5.3 million on almost  of routes. In 1966 the airline was operating Fairchild F-27 turboprops and Martin 4-0-4 prop aircraft from Smith Reynolds Airport with fifteen weekday departures, direct to Asheville, Atlanta, Baltimore, Charleston, WV, Charlottesville, VA, Cincinnati, Fayetteville, NC, Kinston, NC, Knoxville, Louisville, Myrtle Beach, Newport News, Norfolk, Washington, DC, Wilmington and other destinations.

In 1968 Piedmont was flying Boeing 727-100 jetliners nonstop to Asheville and Roanoke and direct to Atlanta, New York La Guardia Airport and Charlottesville. Piedmont also flew Fairchild Hiller FH-227B turboprops from INT.  By 1978, the airline was operating Boeing 727s and Boeing 737-200s in addition to NAMC YS-11 turboprops and had added direct jets to Chicago O'Hare Airport and nonstop jets to Washington National Airport.  In 1983 all Piedmont flights from Smith Reynolds Airport were being operated with Boeing 737-200 jets with nonstops to Atlanta and Washington D.C. and direct flights to Denver and Louisville with a total of four 737 departures a day being operated.

Piedmont had grown into one of the nation's major airlines with an all-jet mainline fleet when it was acquired by and merged into USAir in 1989.  Piedmont's largest operation in later years was located at Charlotte/Douglas International Airport, a major hub for the airline, but Piedmont continued to serve Smith Reynolds Airport as well.  USAir (later US Airways which has since been merged into American Airlines) closed its INT crew base in 1991.  Their heavy aircraft maintenance base was closed in September 1998, leaving only speciality maintenance shops, the last of which closed in 2005.  US Airways maintained its largest reservations centre in Winston-Salem before merging with American.

Other prior airline service 
Capital Airlines and Eastern Air Lines operated flights into Smith Reynolds Airport until 1961.  The June 1, 1960 Eastern Air Lines system timetable listed nonstop flights to Washington National Airport and Charlotte as well as direct service between INT and New York La Guardia Airport, New York Newark Airport, Atlanta, Providence, RI, Richmond, VA, Atlantic City, NJ, Wilmington, NC and other destinations operated with Convair 440, Lockheed Constellation (L-1049 "Super-G" model) and Martin 4-0-4 prop aircraft.  According to its June 1, 1961 system timetable, Capital Airlines was serving the airport with British-manufactured Vickers Viscount four-engine turboprops with nonstops to Asheville, NC and Richmond, VA and direct one-stop service to Atlanta and Washington National Airport. Capital and Eastern then ceased serving the airport and the only scheduled passenger airline flights were then operated by Piedmont and its successors. Nonstops operated by Piedmont may never have reached beyond Washington, DC and Atlanta. 

By 1984, the only scheduled air carrier flights were being operated by commuter turboprops to the nearby Piedmont hub at Charlotte (CLT).  In 1989, USAir Express was operating seven flights a day between the airport and Charlotte with British Aerospace BAe Jetstream 31 and Short 360 commuter turboprop aircraft.  By 1999, successor US Airways Express was operating only three flights a day between the airport and Charlotte with BAe Jetstream 31 commuter propjets.  US Airways Express commuter air carrier CCAir then ceased its code share service operated on behalf of US Airways to Charlotte in January 2000 and Winston-Salem has not had air carrier flights associated with a major airline since then.  The airport maintains high volume and income with general aviation and private business aircraft activity via Landmark Aviation.  More recently, the airport was receiving monthly service from regional carrier ViaAir operating Embraer EMB-120 Brasilia turboprops from Orlando/Sanford International Airport; however, this service was then discontinued by ViaAir.

Current air freight service

The airport receives FedEx Feeder air freight service from two destinations (Kinston, NC and Greensboro, NC).
The airport receives Freight Runners Express air freight service from Greensboro, NC, and Columbia, SC.

See also 
 North Carolina World War II Army Airfields

References

External links 
  at North Carolina DOT airport guide
 
 

Airports in North Carolina
Airfields of the United States Army Air Forces in North Carolina
Buildings and structures in Winston-Salem, North Carolina
Transportation in Winston-Salem, North Carolina
Transportation in Forsyth County, North Carolina
Buildings and structures associated with the Reynolds family